West Chester is a city in Washington County, Iowa, United States. It is part of the Iowa City, Iowa Metropolitan Statistical Area. The population was 144 at the time of the 2020 census.

History
West Chester was laid out in 1872.

Geography
West Chester is located at  (41.338512, -91.816725).

Demographics

2010 census
At the 2010 census there were 146 people in 63 households, including 45 families, in the city. The racial makup of the city was 95.2% White, 0.7% African American, 0.7% Native American, 0.7% from other races, and 2.7% from two or more races. Hispanic or Latino of any race were 2.1%.

Of the 63 households 25.4% had children under the age of 18 living with them, 52.4% were married couples living together, 11.1% had a female householder with no husband present, 7.9% had a male householder with no wife present, and 28.6% were non-families. 27.0% of households were one person and 9.5% were one person aged 65 or older. The average household size was 2.32 and the average family size was 2.73.

The median age was 46.7 years. 19.2% of residents were under the age of 18; 6.7% were between the ages of 18 and 24; 19.9% were from 25 to 44; 35.6% were from 45 to 64; and 18.5% were 65 or older. The gender makeup of the city was 52.7% male and 47.3% female.

2000 census
At the 2000 census there were 159 people in 70 households, including 42 families, in the city. The racial makup of the city was 98.74% White, and 1.26% from two or more races.

Of the 70 households 21.4% had children under the age of 18 living with them, 50.0% were married couples living together, 7.1% had a female householder with no husband present, and 38.6% were non-families. 28.6% of households were one person and 10.0% were one person aged 65 or older. The average household size was 2.27 and the average family size was 2.84.

The age distribution was 17.0% under the age of 18, 7.5% from 18 to 24, 28.9% from 25 to 44, 31.4% from 45 to 64, and 15.1% 65 or older. The median age was 44 years. For every 100 females, there were 106.5 males. For every 100 females age 18 and over, there were 97.0 males.

The median household income was $37,500 and the median family income  was $41,250. Males had a median income of $35,179 versus $21,667 for females. The per capita income for the city was $22,609. About 5.6% of families and 6.8% of the population were below the poverty line, including none of those under the age of eighteen and 25.0% of those sixty five or over.

Education
The Mid-Prairie Community School District operates local area public schools.

Notable People

 Dick Crayne, NFL Player, University of Iowa Football player

References

Cities in Washington County, Iowa
Cities in Iowa
1872 establishments in Iowa
Populated places established in 1872